Armando Chávez (born 22 July 1955) is a Mexican rower. He competed in the men's double sculls event at the 1984 Summer Olympics.

References

1955 births
Living people
Mexican male rowers
Olympic rowers of Mexico
Rowers at the 1984 Summer Olympics
Place of birth missing (living people)